Armand Cloutier (31 December 1901 – 14 February 1982) was a Liberal party member of the House of Commons of Canada. Born in Manchester, New Hampshire, United States, he was also an accountant and paymaster.

Cloutier was educated at the Commercial College in Victoriaville, then studied accounting at La Salle University in Chicago and also at the Alexander Hamilton Institute in New York.

He was first elected to Parliament at the Drummond—Arthabaska riding in the 1940 general election then re-elected for successive terms in 1945, 1949 and 1953. His first speech in the House of Commons was in February 1942, supporting Allied nations in the World War II effort but objected to proposals for military conscription to support overseas battles. Cloutier was defeated by Samuel Boulanger, an independent liberal candidate, in the 1957 election.

References

External links
 

1901 births
1982 deaths
Politicians from Manchester, New Hampshire
American people of French-Canadian descent
Canadian accountants
La Salle University alumni
Liberal Party of Canada MPs
Members of the House of Commons of Canada from Quebec